Canoeing at the 2010 Summer Youth Olympics in Singapore took place from August 21 to August 25 at the Marina Reservoir. There were sprints on a 420m course and a slalom on flat water and not an artificial Canoe Slalom course.

Competition schedule

Medal summary

Medal table

Events

Boys' Events

Girls' Events

External links
Results book

 
2010 Summer Youth Olympics events
Youth Olympics
2010
Canoeing in Singapore